Austrocidaris spinulosa is a species of sea urchins of the family Cidaridae. Their armour is covered with spines. Austrocidaris spinulosa was first scientifically described in 1910 by Ole Mortensen.

References

Animals described in 1910
Cidaridae
Taxa named by Ole Theodor Jensen Mortensen